The Women's 200 Backstroke at the 10th FINA World Swimming Championships (25m) was swum on 17 December 2010 in Dubai, United Arab Emirates. 36 swimmers swam in the preliminary heats, with the top-8 advancing to a final that evening.

At the start of the event, the existing World (WR) and Championship records (CR) were:
WR:  Shiho Sakai, (Berlin, Germany, 14 November 2009)
CR:  Kirsty Coventry, (Manchester 2008)

Results

Heats

Final

References

Backstroke 200 metre, Women's
World Short Course Swimming Championships
2010 in women's swimming